The Centre for Free Elections and Democracy, or CeSID, is a non-governmental and non-profit organization in Serbia. Founded in 1997, the organization deals with election monitoring in Serbia and the parallel counting up of the votes. CeSID last enclosed about 21,000 volunteers/observers, 165 regional teams, 16 local and 5 regional offices.

References

External links 
 

Non-profit organizations based in Serbia
Elections in Serbia
Organizations established in 1997
Election and voting-related organizations
1997 establishments in Serbia